Homalonychus theologus is a species of true spider in the family Homalonychidae. It is found in the United States and Mexico.

References

External links

 

Araneomorphae
Articles created by Qbugbot
Spiders described in 1924